is a Japanese businessman and the current Chairman of Suzuki Motor Corporation. He has served as either president, chairman or CEO of the company since 1978. In February 2021, the company announced that Suzuki will retire in June 2021 and become an adviser.

Personal life 

Osamu Matsuda was born in Gero, Gifu Prefecture, a city on the banks of River Hida, to Toshiki S. Matsuda and Shunzo on January 30, 1930. After graduating from the Chuo University in 1953, Osamu started his career as a loan officer in a local bank. His life took a turn when he married Shoko Suzuki, the granddaughter of the patriarch of Suzuki Motor Corporation, Michio Suzuki. As Suzuki family did not have a male heir, Osamu was married into the family, and following the Japanese custom, Osamu took up the family name of Suzuki, to become Osamu Suzuki. He is the fourth adopted son to run the company.

Shoko and Osamu Suzuki have three children and the family lives in Hamamatsu city in the Prefecture of Shizuoka, in Japan.

An avid golfer, Suzuki said he golfed 47 times in 2020 when he was 90-years-old.

Career
Osamu Suzuki joined Suzuki Motor Corporation in 1958, worked through various positions including junior management posts and rose to the rank of the Director, in 1963. He became the Junior managing director in 1967 and was promoted to the post of the Senior managing director, in 1972. In 1978, Osamu became the President and the chief executive officer of the Corporation and, in 2000, he stepped down from the post of the CEO to take up the Chairmanship of the Suzuki Motor Corporation.

With more than three decades as the head of Suzuki Motor Corporation, Osamu Suzuki is reported to be one of the longest serving leaders in the global auto industry. Recently, concerns are afloat regarding the successor to Osamu Suzuki, which started taking rounds since the death of Hirotaka Ono, Osamu's son in law, who was being groomed for the take over. Hirotaka Ono died in 2007, at the age of 52, succumbing to pancreatic cancer.

Career highlights

Osamu Suzuki is credited to have transformed Suzuki Corporation into one of the largest small car manufacturers in the world. Instead of taking the major automakers head-on, Osamu expanded the company by finding new markets for its small cars, a strategy, often termed as marketing by diplomacy. He traveled around the globe to find prospective markets for his low priced cars and used diplomacy to penetrate them by forging new alliances.

The market run of Suzuki started in the late sixties when they started setting up satellite manufacturing units abroad. The first of such plants was in Thailand in 1967 which was followed by another one in Indonesia, in 1974. The next year saw Suzuki's entry into the Philippines. In 1980, Suzuki started a plant in Australia and another one in Pakistan, in 1982. He was also successful in forming an alliance with General Motors, which gained Suzuki Corporation, an entry into the European market.

One of the most notable achievements of Osamu Suzuki is his entry into the Indian market in the early eighties. In 1982, Suzuki formed a partnership with the Government of India to launch Maruti Udyog Limited and transformed the market which, until then, was dominated by old fashioned automobiles which ran on outdated technology. In the next decade, the factory turned into the hub of Suzuki manufacturing for the Indian subcontinent and East European markets, producing around 200,000 units a year.

Suzuki entered the New Zealand market in 1984 and five years later, in 1989, extended its reach to Canada while maintaining the service to the markets of Nepal and Bangladesh through its Indian manufacturing unit, to take the total production to 10 million units. By 1993, Suzuki was selling 3 out of 4 and 2 out of 3 cars sold in India and Pakistan respectively and was selling more cars than any other Japanese manufacturer. The nineties also saw Suzuki entering the Asian markets of Korea and Vietnam as well as Egypt and Hungary.

Brisk overseas expansion tailored by Osamu Suzuki made the company grow to such levels that by the start of the 21st century, it had 60 plants in 31 countries and with a sales reach in 190 countries. It even experienced a one-year growth of 33.7 per cent in 2003 with the sales turn over reaching 16.8157 billion. The next year saw Suzuki becoming the largest small car manufacturer in Japan, The two wheeler division, the third behind Honda and Yamaha and the outboard engine division making rapid strides.

Suzuki Corporation made a record profit of 107.5 billion and its shares rose 13 per cent against the 3.5 percent decline experienced by the market.

Osamu Suzuki led the formation of a capital alliance with competitor Toyota Motor Corp in 2019 in a bid to partner in the development of self-driving vehicles.

Legacy

Osamu Suzuki built the Suzuki empire, in a conservative way, by looking across the globe for prospective buyers and by cutting costs sharply. He is stated to be concerned about wasteful spending and always on the look-out for ways to save costs. It is reported that once, during a routine factory inspection, he cited 215 cases of wasteful expenditure such as removing 1900 light bulbs to save 40,000 in electricity costs, asking the executives to take split trip railway tickets, rather than direct fare tickets, thereby saving 2 per ticket and changing the color of the factory floor to save paint.

During his reign as the chief executive officer, Suzuki Corporation was transformed into a global conglomerate. He was successful in spreading the Suzuki message in 190 countries where the auto giant is having significant presence. He had the vision to avoid a direct fight with the other global auto manufacturers who were competing with each other using cutting-edge technology. Instead, he looked out for unexplored markets with small but modern cars which changed the automobile trends in the countries he entered. In India, for example, he introduced small modern cars when the market was dominated by old fashioned, outdated cars, there by, reportedly, revolutionizing the auto industry.

Osamu Suzuki's fiscal prudence is reported to be one of the reasons behind the rise of Suzuki Motor Corporation to the status of an auto giant by selling small low priced cars, still making a profit.

Awards and recognitions
 Padma Bhushan – Government of India – 2007
 Sitara-e-Pakistan – Government of Pakistan – 1984
 Middle Cross with the Star Order of Merit – Republic of Hungary – 2004

References

1930 births
Recipients of the Padma Bhushan in trade and industry
Japanese businesspeople
Japanese chairpersons of corporations
Recipients of Pakistani civil awards and decorations
Suzuki people
Chief executives in the automobile industry
Living people
Mukoyōshi
Chuo University alumni